Domingo Salvador Pérez (born 7 June 1936) is a Uruguayan football forward who played for Uruguay in the 1962 and 1966 FIFA World Cups. He also played for Club Nacional de Football.

References

External links
FIFA profile

1936 births
Living people
Uruguayan footballers
Uruguay international footballers
Association football forwards
Uruguayan Primera División players
Club Nacional de Football players
1962 FIFA World Cup players
1966 FIFA World Cup players
1967 South American Championship players
Copa América-winning players
Club Atlético River Plate footballers
Rampla Juniors players
Footballers from Paysandú